Wadi Musa (literally "Valley of Musa (AS)) is a town located in the Ma'an Governorate in southern Jordan. It is the administrative center of the Petra Department and the nearest town to the archaeological site of Petra.

Etymology
Wadi Musa means "Valley of Moses" in Arabic. It is said that Moses passed through the valley and struck water from the rock for his followers at the site of Ain Musa ("Moses Spring" or "Moses' Well"). The Nabateans built channels that carried water from this spring to the city of Petra. Wadi Musa was also nicknamed the "Guardian of Petra". The Tomb of Aaron, the traditional burial site of biblical Aaron, the brother of Moses, is on nearby Jebel Harun, a strong candidate for biblical Mount Hor.

History
During the Crusader period, the area was part of the Lordship of Oultrejordain and was defended by the a castle, li Vaux Moysi.

During the Arab Revolt, Turkish forces under the command of Mehmed Djemal Pasha attacked Wadi Musa on 21 Oct. 1917. The Ottoman forces were defeated by forces under the command of Mawlud Mukhlis, Faisal's aide-de-camp.

The Jordanian census of 1961 found 654 inhabitants in Wadi Musa.

Climate
In Wadi Musa, there is a semi-arid climate. Most rain falls in the winter. The Köppen-Geiger climate classification is BSk. About  of precipitation falls annually.

Demographics
As of 2009, Wadi Musa's population was 17,085, with a male-to-female sex ratio of 52.1 to 47.9 (8,901 males and 8,184 females), making it the most populous settlement of the Petra Department. As of the 2004 census, Petra Department, which includes Wadi Musa and 18 other villages, had a population of 23,840 inhabitants.

Most of the town's population belongs to the Layathnah tribe, whose members play leading roles in the region's economy and politics and dominate the local tourism industry since the 20th century. Almost the entire population is Muslim.

Economy
With more than 50 hotels and many tourist restaurants, its economy is almost entirely tied to tourism.

The campus of the College of Archaeology, Tourism & Hotel Management of Al-Hussein Bin Talal University is located in Wadi Musa.

Gallery

References

Bibliography

External links

 Photos of Wadi Musa at the American Center of Research
 Photos of Wadi Musa at the Manar al-Athar photo archive

Populated places in Ma'an Governorate
Musa